The Whiteclay River is a river in Cochrane District and Timiskaming District in northeastern Ontario, Canada. It is in the James Bay drainage basin and is a left tributary of the Black River.

Course
The river begins at Swan Lake in geographic Maisonville Township in the Unorganized West Part of Timiskaming District. It flows east under Ontario Highway 11 and the Ontario Northland Railway (ONR) line to Upper Twin Lake. It then heads north, passes again under the ONR, takes in the right tributary Wolf Creek, and heads into geographic Benoit Township, Cochrane District. The river continues north into the municipality of Black River-Matheson, and reaches its mouth at the Black River. The Black River flows via the Abitibi River and the Moose River to James Bay.

References

Other map sources:

Rivers of Timiskaming District
Rivers of Cochrane District